Pejić is a Croatian and Serbian surname, and may refer to:

Andreja Pejić, Bosnian-Australian top model
Jelena Pejić, Miss Serbia and Montenegro 2004
Katarina Pejić, mother of Yugoslav writer Ivo Andrić
Marko Pejić, Croatian footballer
Mel Pejic, English footballer of Serb descent
Mihajlo Pejić, US WW II Medal of Honor recipient of Serb descent
Mike Pejic, English footballer of Serb descent
Miroslav Pejić, Bosnian Croat footballer of Croat descent
Pero Pejić, Croatian footballer
Shaun Pejic, English-born Welsh footballer of Serb descent

Croatian surnames
Serbian surnames